Isohydnocera aegra is a species of checkered beetles in the family Cleridae. It is found in North America.

References

 Corporaal, J. B. / Hincks, W. D., ed. (1950). Coleopterorum Catalogus Supplementa, Pars 23: (Editio Secunda) Cleridae, 373.
 Wolcott, Albert B. (1947). "Catalogue of North American beetles of the family Cleridae". Fieldiana: Zoology, vol. 32, no. 2, 61–105.

Further reading

 Arnett, R.H. Jr., M. C. Thomas, P. E. Skelley and J. H. Frank. (eds.). (2002). American Beetles, Volume II: Polyphaga: Scarabaeoidea through Curculionoidea. CRC Press LLC, Boca Raton, FL.
 Arnett, Ross H. (2000). American Insects: A Handbook of the Insects of America North of Mexico. CRC Press.
 Richard E. White. (1983). Peterson Field Guides: Beetles. Houghton Mifflin Company.

Cleridae
Beetles described in 1840